Allemand may refer to:

 Allemand (surname)
 The French language name for the German language and Germans 
 Elbling, a German wine grape that is also known as Allemand

See also 
 Allemande, an instrumental dance form in Baroque music or a movement in square dancing